Martin Winter (born 7 August 1965 in Osnabrück, Germany) is a German chemist and materials scientist. His research in the field of electrochemical energy storage and conversion focuses on the development of new materials, components and cell designs for batteries and supercapacitors, lithium ion batteries and lithium metal batteries.

Career and research 
Martin Winter graduated in chemistry from the University of Münster (Westfälische Wilhelms-Universität Münster) in 1992. He obtained his Ph.D. (1995) under the professorship of Jürgen O. Besenhard and worked as Post-Doctoral Research Fellow with Prof. Petr Novak at the Paul Scherrer Institute in Switzerland. After habilitation in 1999, Martin Winter held a full professorship and the chair at the Institute of Chemical Technology of Inorganic Materials at the TU Graz. In 2008 he came back to Münster to hold the professorship for “Materials Science, Energy and Electrochemistry” at the Institute of Physical Chemistry at the University of Münster. The full professorship developed from an endowed full professorship funded by the companies Volkswagen, Evonik Industries and Chemetall (today Albemarle) from 2008 to 2012. He was full professor for “Applied Materials Science for Electrochemical Energy Storage and Conversion” between 2008 and 2016 and is full professor for “Materials Science, Energy and Electrochemistry” since 2016.

In 2008 Martin Winter founded the MEET Battery Research Center at the University of Münster. Until today he is the scientific director of MEET, which stands for „Münster Electrochemical Energy Technology“. Since January 2015 he is also the founding director of the Helmholtz-Institute Münster (HI MS) “Ionics in Energy Storage”, which is part of the Institute of Energy and Climate Research (IEK) of Forschungszentrum Jülich.

His expertise in battery research led to diverse advisory positions and activities. As the chairman of the Advisory Board of German Battery Research by the Federal Ministry of Education and Research (BMBF), former spokesman of the Innovation Alliance LIB2015, spokesman of the battery initiative Batterie2020 of the BMBF, head of the Battery Competence Center (ElektroMobilität NRW) and member of the "Electromobility" expert council of the North Rhine-Westphalian state government he represents the German battery research on national and international level. Martin Winter is President of the International Meeting on Lithium Batteries (IMLB), chairman of the International Battery Materials Association (IBA), Fellow of the International Society of Electrochemistry (ISE) and of the Electrochemical Society (ECS), where he is also board member of the Battery Division. He has published more than 500 articles in journals, books and proceedings and has filed ca. 70 patent applications (2018).

Awards and honors 
Martin Winter is a highly cited author as recognized by ISI (Thomson Reuters), The Shanghai Ranking, and Elsevier Scopus. Among more than 40 awards and recognitions, he holds the Carl Wagner Memorial Award of the Electrochemical Society (ECS), has been the recipient of the Research and Technology awards of both, the ECS and the International Battery Materials Association (IBA) and was recognized by the “Braunschweiger Forschungspreis”. In 2018 he was awarded the Federal Cross of Merit 1st class. Martin Winter is Honorary Professor at the National Taiwan University of Science and Technology (Taipei, Taiwan) and the National Cheng Kung University in Tainan (Taiwan).

Literature (selection)

References

External links 
 Profile Martin Winter on the website of MEET Battery Research Center, University Münster
 MEET Battery Research Center, University Münster
 Helmholtz Association of German Research Centres
 Forschungszentrum Jülich

1965 births
Living people
21st-century German chemists
German materials scientists
University of Münster alumni
Officers Crosses of the Order of Merit of the Federal Republic of Germany
Scientists from Osnabrück
Academic staff of the University of Münster